Arthur Ashkin (September 2, 1922 – September 21, 2020) was an American scientist and Nobel laureate who worked at Bell Laboratories and Lucent Technologies. Ashkin has been considered by many as the father of optical tweezers,
for which he was awarded the Nobel Prize in Physics 2018 at age 96, becoming the oldest Nobel Laureate until 2019 when John B. Goodenough was awarded at 97. He resided in Rumson, New Jersey.

Ashkin started his work on manipulation of microparticles with laser light in the late 1960s which resulted in the invention of optical tweezers in 1986. He also pioneered the optical trapping process that eventually was used to manipulate atoms, molecules, and biological cells. The key phenomenon is the radiation pressure of light; this pressure can be dissected down into optical gradient and scattering forces.

Early life and family 
Arthur Ashkin was born in Brooklyn, New York, in 1922, to a family of Ukrainian-Jewish background.  His parents were Isadore and Anna Ashkin. He had two siblings, a brother, Julius, also a physicist, and a sister, Ruth. One older sibling, Gertrude, died while young. The family home was in Brooklyn, New York, at 983 E 27 Street. Isadore (né Aschkinase) had emigrated to the United States from Odessa (then Russian Empire, now Ukraine), at the age of 18. Anna, five years younger, also came from today's Ukraine, then Galicia, Austro-Hungarian Empire. Within a decade of his landing in New York, Isadore had become a U.S. citizen and was running a dental laboratory at 139 Delancey Street in Manhattan.

Ashkin met his wife, Aline, at Cornell University, and they were married for over 60 years with three children and five grandchildren. She was a chemistry teacher at Holmdel High School, and their son Michael Ashkin, is an art professor at Cornell University.

Education 
Ashkin graduated from Brooklyn's James Madison High School in 1940. He then attended Columbia University and was also a technician for Columbia's Radiation Lab tasked with building magnetrons for U.S. military radar systems. He joined the U.S. Army reserves on July 31, 1945. He continued working in the Columbia University lab. During this period, by Ashkin's own account, three Nobel laureates were in attendance.

Ashkin finished his course work and obtained his BS degree in physics at Columbia University in 1947. He then attended Cornell University, where he studied nuclear physics. This was during the era of the Manhattan Project, and Ashkin's brother, Julius Ashkin, was successfully part of it. This led to Arthur Ashkin's introduction to Hans Bethe, Richard Feynman and others who were at Cornell at the time.

He received his PhD degree at Cornell University in 1952, and then went to work for Bell Labs at the request and recommendation of Sidney Millman, who was Ashkin's supervisor at Columbia University.

Career 
At Bell Labs, Ashkin worked in the microwave field until about 1960 to 1961, and then switched to laser research. His research and published articles at that time pertained to nonlinear optics, optical fibers, parametric oscillators and parametric amplifiers. Also, at Bell Labs during the 1960s, he was the co-discoverer of the photorefractive effect in the piezoelectric crystal.

Within various professional society memberships, Ashkin attained the rating of fellow in the Optical Society of America (OSA), the American Physical Society (APS), and the Institute of Electrical and Electronics Engineers (IEEE). He retired from Bell Labs in 1992 after a 40-year career during which he contributed to many areas of experimental physics. He authored many research papers over the years and held 47 patents. He was recipient of the Joseph F. Keithley Award For Advances in Measurement Science in 2003 and the Harvey Prize in 2004. He was elected to the National Academy of Engineering in 1984 and to the National Academy of Sciences in 1996. He was inducted into the National Inventors Hall of Fame in 2013. He continued to work in his home lab.

Besides optical tweezers, Ashkin is also known for his studies in photorefraction, second harmonic generation, and
non-linear optics in fibers.

Recent advances in physics and biology using optical micromanipulation include achievement of Bose–Einstein condensation in atomic vapors at submillikelvin temperatures, demonstration of atom lasers, and detailed measurements on individual motor molecules.

Ashkin's work formed the basis for Steven Chu's work on cooling and trapping atoms, which earned Chu the 1997 Nobel Prize in physics.

Nobel Prize 
On October 2, 2018, Arthur Ashkin was awarded a Nobel Prize in Physics for his work on optical trapping. Ashkin "was honoured for his invention of 'optical tweezers' that grab particles, atoms, viruses and other living cells with their laser beam fingers. With this he was able to use the radiation pressure of light to move physical objects, 'an old dream of science fiction', the Royal Swedish Academy of Sciences said." He was awarded half of the Prize while the other half was shared between Gérard Mourou and Donna Strickland for their work on chirped-pulse amplification, a technique "now used in laser machining [that] enables doctors to perform millions of corrective laser eye surgeries every year".
 
At 96, Ashkin was the oldest Nobel Prize laureate to be awarded the prize, until John B. Goodenough received the Nobel Prize in Chemistry in 2019 at the age of 97. He died on September 21, 2020 at the age of 98.

References

External links 

Frontiers in Optics 2010. The Optical Society.

National Academy of Engineering: Member listing
National Academy of Sciences: Member listing
Ashkin's Book on Atom Trapping
Frederic Ives Medal
  including the Nobel Lecture on 8 December 2018 Optical Tweezers and their Application to Biological Systems

1922 births
2020 deaths
Scientists from Brooklyn
Nobel laureates in Physics
American Nobel laureates
21st-century American physicists
American people of Ukrainian-Jewish descent
American people of Russian-Jewish descent
Optical physicists
Columbia College (New York) alumni
Cornell University alumni
Scientists at Bell Labs
Laser researchers
Fellows of Optica (society)
Fellows of the American Physical Society
Fellow Members of the IEEE
Jewish physicists
Members of the United States National Academy of Sciences
Members of the United States National Academy of Engineering
People from Rumson, New Jersey
United States Army personnel of World War II
United States Army reservists